CCU may refer to:

Hospitals
 Coronary care unit, a hospital wing meant for monitoring patients with heart problems
 Critical care unit, in a hospital (UK terminology), similar to intensive care unit (ICU) in other countries; or, a unit that provides higher care than an ICU does

Technology
 Camera control unit, for a video camera
 Carbon capture and utilization, recycling carbon emissions for fuel
 Concurrent users, number of users using the application simultaneously

Universities
 California Coast University, a university in Santa Ana, California, USA
 Chaudhary Charan Singh University, a University in Meerut, Uttar Pradesh [UP], India
 Chinese Culture University, a university in Taipei, Taiwan
 Cincinnati Christian University, a university in Cincinnati, Ohio, USA
 Coastal Carolina University, a university in Horry County, South Carolina, USA
 Colorado Christian University, a liberal arts college in Lakewood, Colorado, USA
 National Chung Cheng University, a public university in Chiayi, Taiwan

Organizations
 Cambodian Confederation of Unions, a Cambodian national trade union centre
 Compañía de las Cervecerías Unidas, a Chilean drinks and beer company
 Common Cold Unit
 Confederation of Canadian Unions, a labour union central in Canada
 Commonwealth Credit Union, a financial institution in Kentucky
 Correctional Custody Unit, United States Marine Corps

Other uses
 Netaji Subhash Chandra Bose International Airport (Kolkata Airport, IATA code CCU), formerly known as Dum Dum Airport, located in Dum Dum, India
 CCU, a codon for the amino acid proline

See also